Rhenanorallus is a genus of prehistoric rail which existed in Mainz Basin, Germany during the late Oligocene or early Miocene. It was described by Gerald Mayr in 2010, from a humerus. The type species is Rhenanorallus rhenanus.

References

Bird genera
Prehistoric birds of Europe
Fossil taxa described in 2010
Birds described in 2010